"Doing Alright with the Boys" is a song by English glam rock singer Gary Glitter, written by Glitter with Mike Leander and produced by Mike Leander. It was released as a standalone single in the UK in 1975, and peaked at No. 6 on the UK Singles Chart. The single features the non-album track, "Good for No Good" as its B-side, which was exclusive to the single.

In 1980 Joan Jett covered the song for her debut solo studio album, Bad Reputation.

Track listing
"Doing Alright with the Boys" – 3:18
"Good for No Good" – 2:39

Chart performance

References

External links
 

1975 songs
1975 singles
Gary Glitter songs
Joan Jett songs
Songs written by Mike Leander
Songs written by Gary Glitter
Song recordings produced by Mike Leander